Amata tripunctata is a moth of the subfamily Arctiinae. It was described by George Thomas Bethune-Baker in 1911 and is found in Angola.

References

 Natural History Museum Lepidoptera generic names catalog

Endemic fauna of Angola
tripunctata
Moths described in 1911
Moths of Africa